Omaha Benson High School Magnet, Benson High Magnet, or Benson High, is located at 5120 Maple Street in Omaha, Nebraska, United States, in the Benson community of Omaha. The original site of Benson High was the current building that houses Benson West Elementary School. Founded in 1904, Benson High is one of the oldest high schools in the state. Its enrollment is approximately 1,500 students.  As of 2018, the principal was Tom Wagner. The school mascot is the Bunny.

A full renovation of the school was completed in the mid-1990s.  Additions included a new science classroom wing, an auditorium for the performing arts, a gymnasium, a student commons area and a track and football field. The football field and track were redone once again during the 2006 summer. 

Benson is currently participating in NASA's Student Launch Initiative program.

Omaha Benson High School is also one of the Omaha area schools that participates in the yearly Day of Silence event.

Athletics

State championships

"The N-Word" controversy
In April 2007, the student newspaper published a four-page special feature entitled "The N-Word" examining the use of the racial epithet "nigger" within the school community.  It included factual reporting, editorial content, and a transcript of a round-table discussion on the topic in one of the school's ethics classes.

Community response was mixed.  Many students and parents, and the school's principal, were supportive of the newspaper's coverage, but the school district received many phone calls expressing concern or offense at the content.  The school district, Omaha Public Schools, put the principal on temporary administrative leave and denounced the publication.  The principal was later reinstated.

Notable alumni
 Tom Becka, talk radio personality
 Jackie Brandt, MLB player and 1961 American League All-Star
 Walter Holden Capps, U.S. Representative from California
 Hal Daub, U.S. Representative from Nebraska
 Terry Goodkind, fantasy author
 Dave Hoppen (born 1964), NBA player
 Floyd Kalber, television journalist
 David Karnes, U.S. Senator from Nebraska, 1987 through 1989
 Kenton Keith, professional football player
 Nile Kinnick, football player and 1939 Heisman Trophy winner
 Nick Nolte (born 1941), film actor
 Robert Reed, science fiction author
 Amber Ruffin, writer, Late Night With Seth Meyers, The Detroiters (Comedy Central), The Amber Ruffin Show
Khyri Thomas (born 1996), American basketball player for Maccabi Tel Aviv of the Israeli Basketball Premier League and the EuroLeague, former NBA player
 Tony Veland, NFL safety
 Andre Woolridge, professional basketball player, All American at the University of Iowa

See also
 Omaha Public Schools

References

External links
 Benson High School's home page
 Omaha Benson High School alumni website

Omaha Public Schools
Educational institutions established in 1904
High schools in Omaha, Nebraska
Public high schools in Nebraska
Magnet schools in Nebraska
1904 establishments in Nebraska